The second USS Perry was a  in the United States Navy. She was named for Commodore Oliver Hazard Perry.

Construction
Perry was laid down on 19 April 1899, by Union Iron Works, San Francisco, California; launched on 27 October 1900; sponsored by Miss Maude O'Connor; and commissioned on 4 September 1902.

Pre-World War I

Perry was assigned to the Pacific Torpedo Flotilla and based at Mare Island until the United States entered World War I. Her operations took her as far north as Alaska and south along the coast of Mexico; and in the fall of 1908, combined fleet maneuvers took her to Hawaii.

Perhaps the highlight of the torpedo boat destroyer's career came during the earthquake which struck San Francisco on 18 April 1906, and the resulting fire which devastated the city. For four days after, they were awakened by severe rolling and pitching of their ship before dawn on 18 April, the crew labored to save the western metropolis by fighting fires; patrolling districts where stores, warehouses, and homes were threatened by looters; and providing medical aid to countless injured men, women, and children.

In 1914, Perry observed the Topolobampo naval campaign in the Gulf of California during the Mexican Revolution, she was present at the Fourth Battle of Topolobampo, the final naval action of the campaign.

World War I
When the United States entered World War I, Perry patrolled off the California Coast until steaming to Panama where, beginning on 28 July 1917, she guarded the entrance to the vital canal. On 30 May 1918, she sailed for Key West for patrol duty in the Florida Keys. After the Armistice, she got under way for the Delaware Bay on 29 January 1919, and remained at the Philadelphia Navy Yard until decommissioning on 2 July. Perrys name was struck from the Naval Vessel Register on 15 September, and she was sold to Henry A. Hitner's Sons Company for scrapping on 5 January 1920.

Noteworthy commanding officers
 Lieutenant commander Frank Herman Schofield (25 June 1904 – 1 November 1905) (Later Rear Admiral)
 Lieutenant Edgar Brown Larimer (11 July 1907 – 13 October 1909) (Later Rear admiral  and Chief of the Bureau of Ordnance (1931-1934))
 Lieutenant JG Harry Adrian McClure (11 September 1915 – 3 April 1916) (Later Commodore)

Notes

External links
Photos of USS Perry

 

Bainbridge-class destroyers
World War I destroyers of the United States
1906 San Francisco earthquake
Ships built in San Francisco
1900 ships
Ships built by Union Iron Works